John Hewitt (born 9 February 1963 in Aberdeen) is a Scottish former footballer and manager, who spent the majority of his playing career with Aberdeen F.C., but also had spells with Celtic and St Mirren among others. He also spent a short time in management in Ireland with Dundalk before retiring from the game.

He is best known as the scorer of a number of significant goals for Aberdeen, including the winning goal in the 1983 Cup Winners' Cup final. He was inducted into the Aberdeen FC "Hall of Fame" as one of the founding members in 2003.

Playing career
Hewitt was a product of Cornhill Primary and Middlefield Boys' Club in Aberdeen, and was a schoolboy international before signing for Aberdeen, the club he had supported as a boy, in the face of competition from a number of other clubs. He made his full debut for Aberdeen in 1979 at the age of 17, and by the 1981–82 season had become a regular in the side. in January 1982, Hewitt scored the only goal of the game in a third round Scottish Cup tie against Motherwell. This goal, timed at 9.6 seconds, was not only the fastest recorded in Scottish Cup history, but proved to be the first step in Aberdeen's route to the following season's European success; the club qualified for the Cup Winners' Cup by going on to win the Scottish Cup that season.

The following season, Hewitt again featured prominently for Aberdeen, but it is for two substitute appearances in Europe that he is best known. On 16 March 1983, Hewitt came off the bench to score the winning goal in the Cup Winners' Cup quarter-final tie against Bayern Munich, and then repeated the feat by scoring the winner in extra time in the final against Real Madrid.

Hewitt also scored twice in the 1986 Scottish Cup Final against Hearts – a game in which he was named Man of the match. In all, he won three championship medals, four Scottish Cup winners medals, one Scottish League Cup winner's medal as well as the Cup Winners' Cup and the following season's UEFA Super Cup while at Aberdeen.

In 1989, Hewitt moved to Celtic, but failed to break into the first team on a regular basis, and subsequently spent four more successful seasons with St Mirren. A short, unsuccessful spell as player-manager of Dundalk was notable only for the fact that he scored the only goal of a pre-season friendly game against Aberdeen. Hewitt retired from the game after a season as assistant manager to his former Aberdeen team-mate Doug Rougvie at Cove Rangers.

Career statistics

Club 
Appearances and goals by club, season and competition

References

1963 births
Living people
Footballers from Aberdeen
Scottish footballers
Scottish expatriate footballers
Scottish expatriate sportspeople in Ireland
Aberdeen F.C. players
Celtic F.C. players
St Mirren F.C. players
Deveronvale F.C. players
Middlesbrough F.C. players
Dundalk F.C. players
Ross County F.C. players
Brantwood F.C. players
Dundalk F.C. managers
League of Ireland players
League of Ireland managers
Scottish Football League players
English Football League players
Cove Rangers F.C. players
Scotland under-21 international footballers
Association football forwards
Scotland youth international footballers
Scottish football managers